The Lossen rearrangement is the conversion of a hydroxamate ester to an isocyanate.  Typically O-acyl, sulfonyl, or phosphoryl O-derivative are employed. The isocyanate can be used further to generate ureas in the presence of amines  or generate amines in the presence of H2O.

Reaction mechanism

The mechanism below begins with an O-acylated hydroxamic acid derivative that is treated with base to form an isocyanate that generates an amine and CO2 gas in the presence of H2O. The hydroxamic acid derivative is first converted to its conjugate base by abstraction of a hydrogen by a base. Spontaneous rearrangement releases a carboxylate anion to produce the isocyanate intermediate. The isocyanate is then hydrolyzed in the presence of H2O. Finally, the respective amine and CO2 are generated by abstraction of a proton with a base and decarboxylation.

Hydroxamic acids are commonly synthesized from their corresponding esters.

Historical references

See also
Curtius rearrangement
Hofmann rearrangement
Schmidt reaction
Beckmann rearrangement

Gabapentin

References

External links 
 

Rearrangement reactions
Name reactions